Wikiversity is a Wikimedia Foundation project that supports learning communities, their learning materials, and resulting activities. It differs from Wikipedia in that it offers tutorials and other materials for the fostering of learning, rather than an encyclopedia. Like Wikipedia, it is available in many languages.

One element of Wikiversity is a set of WikiJournals which publish peer-reviewed articles in a stable, indexed, and citable format comparable with academic journals. These can be copied to Wikipedia, and are sometimes based on Wikipedia articles.

History 
Wikiversity's data phase officially began on August 15, 2006, with the English language Wikiversity.

The idea of Wikiversity began with the initial development of the Wikiversity community within the Wikibooks project, however when it was nominated for deletion from Wikibooks, soon there was a proposal to make Wikiversity an independent Wikimedia project, with the fundamental goal to broaden the scope of activities within the Wikimedia community to include additional types of learning resources in addition to textbooks.

Two proposals were made. The first project proposal was not approved (2005) and the second, modified proposal, was approved (2006).

The launch of Wikiversity was announced at Wikimania 2006 as an idea to:

Project details 
Wikiversity is a center for the creation of and use of free learning materials, and the provision of learning activities. Wikiversity is one of many wikis used in educational contexts, as well as many initiatives that are creating free and open educational resources.

The primary priorities and goals for Wikiversity are to:
Create and host a range of free-content, multilingual learning materials/resources, for all age groups in all languages.
Host scholarly/learning projects and communities that support these materials.

The Wikiversity e-Learning model places emphasis on "learning groups" and "learning by doing". Wikiversity's motto and slogan is "set learning free", indicating that groups/communities of Wikiversity participants will engage in learning projects. Learning is facilitated through collaboration on projects that are detailed, outlined, summarized or results reported by editing Wikiversity pages. Wikiversity learning projects include collections of wiki webpages concerned with the exploration of a particular topic. Wikiversity participants are encouraged to express their learning goals, and the Wikiversity community collaborates to develop learning activities and projects to accommodate those goals. The Wikiversity e-Learning activities give learners the opportunity to build knowledge. Students have to be language-aware in order to be able to correct their classmates. By doing this, students develop their reflection skills. Secondly, they enable students to be autonomous deciding what to write or edit, also when and how to do it. Students are able to free resort to any mean of support. At the same time, it fosters cognitive development, engaging students to collaborate.

Learning resources are developed by an individual or groups, either on their own initiative, or as part of a learning project. Wikiversity resources include teaching aids, lesson plans, curricula, links to off-site resources, course notes, example and problem sets, computer simulations, reading lists, and other as devised by participants – but do not include final polished textbooks. Texts useful to others are hosted at Wikibooks for update and maintenance. Learning groups with interests in each subject area create a web of resources that form the basis of discussions and activities at Wikiversity. Learning resources can be used by educators outside of Wikiversity for their own purposes, under the terms of the GFDL and a Creative Commons license (like Wikipedia).

Wikiversity "administrators" are metaphorically referred to as "custodians".

Wikiversity also allows original research (in contrast to Wikipedia which does not). Such research content may lack any peer review.

WikiJournals 

Several s operate with an academic journal format on the Wikiversity website (under the WikiJournal User Group). Submitted articles are subjected to peer review by external experts before publication of an indexed, citable, stable version in the journal, and an editable version in Wikipedia. They are wholly free, offering open access to readers and charging no publication fee to authors (diamond open access). Some articles are written from scratch, and others are adapted from Wikipedia articles. They therefore aim to encourage experts to contribute content creation and improvement (as authors and peer reviewers), and provide an additional quality control mechanism for existing Wikipedia content. This activity started with WikiJournal of Medicine in 2014. The sister journals WikiJournal of Science and WikiJournal of Humanities both began publishing in 2018. The WikiJournal User Group received an open publishing award in November 2019.

WikiDebates 
WikiDebates on Wikiversity allow compiling arguments of both sides on controversial topics such as the legality of cannabis, to create an overview. For fairness, users are encouraged to add arguments of their opposing view too.

Languages 
There are currently seventeen different Wikiversities: Arabic, Chinese, Czech, English, Finnish, French, German, Greek, Hindi, Italian, Japanese, Korean, Portuguese, Russian, Slovene, Spanish, and Swedish (locked since 17 June 2021); Wikiversity projects in other languages are being developed at the "beta" multilingual hub.

For newly established specific language Wikiversities to move out of the initial exploratory "beta" phase, the new Wikiversity community must establish policies governing research activities. Wikiversity may act as a repository of research carried out by the Wikimedia Research Network, or others who are involved in wiki-based, or other research. Wikiversity hosts original research in addition to secondary research, unless a specific language group decides upon no research.  It is expected that researchers will respect and update guidelines for appropriate research through a community consensus process. Currently the English Wikiversity hosts more than 376 research pages.

The top ten Wikiversity language projects by mainspace article count:

For a complete list with totals see Wikimedia Statistics:

Reception

PCWorld reported the Wikiversity project in 2007, when the most popular course was on film-making. It compared the project to Massachusetts Institute of Technology's "MIT OpenCourseWare", noting however that while free, MIT's offering was "not free enough for Wikiversity". 

In their 2008 book on Empowering Online Learning, Curtis Bonk and Ke Zhang noted that if "the Wikimedia Foundation can nurture credible resources and communities within Wikiversity, it will send serious shock waves throughout higher education." Steven Hoffman, in his 2010 book on teaching humanities, wrote that Wikiversity could do for higher education what Wikipedia had done "for the traditional encyclopedia". Hoffman noted that Wikiversity courses could look much like traditional online university courses, except that they were open in every sense. He did not expect Wikiversity to replace traditional universities, but could supplement them for "retiring baby boomers" spending time and energy on "education as leisure".

The Association for Psychological Science noted in 2018 that Wikipedia, often "Internet users' first source of information", is constantly changing in search of accuracy, accompanied in this by Wikiversity, its "lesser-known sister site".

J. Rapp et al., writing in 2019, commented that Wikiversity allowed readers to become active contributors; writing materials "can be regarded as a learning task for advanced Wikiversity authors in general." They noted that the Wikijournals differed from conventional journals in being transparent about reviewers' backgrounds, possibly facilitating interdisciplinary discussion, and in revealing the stages in the development of an article (by versioning).

See also 

 OpenLearn
 WikiEducator
Wiki Education Foundation
 Wikipedia:Wikipedia for Schools
WikiJournal User Group

References

External links 

 Wikiversity annual activity
 English Wikiversity annual activity
 The Wikiversity multilingual portal – with links to all Wikiversity sites.
 The English language Wikiversity (in beta phase)
 "Resources for Professional Development" Prepared for the Fall conference of the Missouri Juvenile Justice Association, October—2006, Office of State Courts Administrator, Division of Judicial Education P48.
 "Conference Review" by Peter Mulholland; Journal of Emergency Primary Health Care; Vol.4, Issue 4, 2006. (pdf version)
 Topps, D. "Sharing medical educational resources using free and open-source software." in 7th Annual WONCA Rural Health Conference – Transforming Rural Practice Through Education. 2006. Seattle, WA, USA.
 "Access to Global Learning: A Matter of Will" by Steven R. Van Hook; Education Resources Information Center; (ERIC Document No. ED492804); April 27, 2006.
 "Using Wiki to Promote Collaborative Learning in Statistics Education" by Dani Ben-Zvi; Technology Innovations in Statistics Education; Volume 1, Issue 1, 2007, Article 4; Page 4. (pdf version )
 "Bootstrapping a Semantic Wiki Application for Learning Mathematics" by Claus Zinn.
 "Beyond Difference: Reconfiguring Education for the User-Led Age" by Axel Bruns; Proceedings ICE 3: Ideas, Cyberspace, Education.
 "The Challenges and Successes of Wikibookian Experts and Wikibook Novices:  Classroom and Community Collaborative Experiences" by Suthiporn Sajjapanroj, Curt Bonk, Mimi Lee and Meng-Fen Grace Lin.
 
 "New-Media Art Education and Its Discontents" by Trebor Scholz.
 "Wikiversity; or education meets the free culture movement: An ethnographic investigation" by Norm Friesen, Janet Hopkins.
 Beta Wikiversity

Alternative education
Educational technology projects
Virtual learning environments
Wikimedia projects
Multilingual websites
Internet properties established in 2006
Educational websites
Advertising-free websites